Charity Nochlezhka is a Russian NGO helping homeless people. It works in Saint Petersburg and Moscow.

Nochlezhka started in 1993 publishing newspaper Put Domoi (originally Na Dne) sold by homeless. 

Grigory Sverdlin, the forty-three-year-old director,  was forced to leave Russia.

References

External links
Official site

Charities based in Russia
Organizations based in Saint Petersburg